The 12th Congress of the League of Communists of Yugoslavia ( / ) was held from 26 to 29 June 1982, in the Belgrade Sava Centar. The highest organ of both the government and the party, it was the first Congress of League of Communists of Yugoslavia convened since Josip Broz Tito's death in 1980. It was attended by delegates from all the republics and provinces, as well as a party delegation from the Yugoslav People's Army.

Background
The congress was organized in the backdrop the two years of the morning following the death of Josip Broz Tito.

Number of participants 
The congress was attended by 1721 delegates, 323 high-level state officials and 118 different delegations.

The Agenda

 Choice of working bodies
 Verification of the delegation's power of attorney
 Reports on the work of the organs of the SKJ between Eleventh and Twelfth Congress:
 SKJ Central Committee
 Statutory Issues Commission
 SKJ Supervisory Commissions
 Report from Dušan Dragosavac, President of the Central Committee)
 Discussion on the report and reports of the SKJ bodies
 The choosing of congressional commissions (ie their presidencies and presidents)
 Discussion in the commissions on the future tasks of the ICJ and draft documents of the 12th Congress
 Adoption of the resolution of the 12th congress of SKJ and amendment and amendment of the Statute of the ICJ

The Congress
At the Twelfth Congress, a new Central Committee was elected, consisting of 163 members, a 24-member Statutory Committee and a 15-member Supervisory Committee. Mitja Ribičič was elected for the new presidency of the CK SKJ. Members of the Central Committee of the League of Communists of Yugoslavia elected at the Twelfth Congress:
Ramiz Abduli
 Roman Albrecht
 Dušan Alimpić
 Şahin Arif
 Krste Atanasovski
 Milorad Babić
 Vladimir Bakarić
 Eržebet Balažević
 Milutin Baltić
 Dimë Belovski
 Pál Benak
 Jure Bilić
 Jakov Blažević
 Dušan Bogdanov
 Slobodan Bojanic
 Lojze Briški
 Nevena Bubanja
 Marinko Bulatović
 Vera Bunteska
 Ilija Vakić
 Danilo Vasić
 Živan Vasiljević
 Dušan Veljkovic
 Andrej Verbič
 Dobrivoje Vidić
 Tihomir Vilović
 Radovan Vlajković
 Azem Vllasi
 Tihomir Vlaškalić
 Anton Vratuša
 Josip Vrhovec
 Vuko Vukadinović
 Boško Vukov
 Miodrag Vuković
 Bruno Vuletić
 Spiro Galović
 Majda Gaspari
 Dusan Gligorijevic
 Brake Glomazić-Lekovic
 Happy Gogh
 Peter Gračanin
 Alexander Grlickov
 Boro Denkov
 Veli Deva
 Stojan Dimovski
 Nijaz Dizdarevic
 Stane Dolenc
 Zvone Dragan
 Dusan Dragosavac
 Milojko Drulović
 Rato Dugonjić
 Marko Đuričin
 Predrag Djuric
 Vidoje Žarković
 Silvia Žugić-Rijavec
 Anton Zupančič
 Ljubiša Igić
 Trpe Jakovlevski
 Petar Jakšić
 Slavojka Jankovic
 Vlado Janžić
 Georgije Jovičić
 Šaban Kevrić
 Nikola Kmezić
 Rudi Kolak
 Lazar Koliševski
 Kemal Korajlić
 Dragutin Kosovac
 Đorđe Kostić
 Sergej Krajger
 Anica Kristan
 Boško Krunić
 Milan Kučan
 Ivica Kukoč
 Iljaz Kurteshii
 Todo Kurtović
 Đorđe Lazović
 Marko Lolić
 Milojko Lucic
 Nikola Ljubicic
 Nandor Major
 Branko Mamula
 Zivko Marceta
 Slavko Marićević
 Andrej Marinc
 Dragoslav Markovic
 Coffins Markovski
 Petar Matić
 Rudolf Matosevic
 Ahmet Mehović
 Munir Mesihović
 Fatima Midžić
 Niko Mihaljevic
 Cvijetin Mijatović
 Branko Mikulić
 Obren Milacic
 Slavka Miladinovic
 Veljko Milatovic
 Luka Miletic
 Smiljka Milojevic
 Milos Minic
 Lazar Mojsov
 Joy Morina
 Bogoljub Nedeljkovic
 Mirko Ostojic
 Day Pasic
 Milan Pavic
 Ivo Perišin
 Dragoljub Petrović
 Milka Planinc
 France Drink
 
 Mihajlo Popovic
 Miran Potrč
 Hamdi Pozderac
 Radenko Puzovic
 Ivica Racan
 Ilija Radaković
 Miljan Radovic
 Mićo Rakić
 Hisen Ramadani
 Nikola Ražnatović
 Mitja Ribičič
 Marjan Rožič
 Alenko Rubeša
 Zorka Sekulović
 Boro Simić
 Jakov Sirotković
 Janko Smole
 Aleksandar Spirkovski
 Vojislav Srzentić
 Petar Stambolić
 Metodija Stefanovski
 
 Stanislav Stojanovic
 Stojan Stojcevski
 Vlado Strugar
 Taip Taipi
 Arif Tanović
 Branko Trpenovski
 Dane Ćuić
 Dobroslav Ćulafić
 Fadil Quranoli
 Igor Uršić
 Ivo Fabinc
 Marko Filipović
 Nikica Franović
 Kiro Hadži-Vasilev
 Sinan Hasani
 Franjo Herljević
 Sanije Hiseni
 Ivan Hočevar
 Fadil Hoxha
 Jože Ciuha
 Marijan Cvetkovic
 Angel Čemerski
 Dušan Čkrebić
 Milan Dzajkovski
 Boško Šiljegović
 Kolë Shiroka
 Drago Šofranac
 Mika Špiljak
 Ali Shukria.

Sources

References 
Cohen, LJ (1993): Broken Bonds: The Disintegration of Yugoslavia, Boulder-San Francisco-Oxford: Westview Press
Ramet, SP (2005): Balkan Babylon. The breakup of Yugoslavia from Tito's death to Milošević's fall, Zagreb: Alinea
Silber, L., Little, A. (1996): Death of Yugoslavia, Opatija: Otokar Keršovani
History of the Communist Union of Yugoslavia. Research Center "Communist" Belgrade, "National Book" Belgrade and "Work" Belgrade, 1985.

1982
Government of Yugoslavia
Politics of Yugoslavia
Socialist Federal Republic of Yugoslavia
1982 in Yugoslavia
1982 in politics
1982 conferences
Congresses of communist parties